The 2014 MSA British Rally Championship was the 56th season of the British Rally Championship. The season began on 3 May in Carlisle with the Pirelli Richard Burns Foundation Rally and ended on 13 September in Douglas with the Rally Isle of Man powered by Microgaming.

The championship was won by the Irish crew of Daniel McKenna and Arthur Kierans, who won four of the season's six rallies, to win the championship by eleven points ahead of Osian Pryce and Dale Furniss; Pryce and Furniss won the other two events to be held.

Event calendar and results

The 2014 calendar consisted of six rounds at five events with a double header held at the Rally Isle of Man. A seventh event, Rallye Dorset, was cancelled in July.

Championship standings

Drivers' championship
A driver's best five scores counted towards the final championship standings. Points were awarded to the highest placed registered driver on each event as follows: 20, 18, 16, 15, and so on deleting one point per placing down to one single point for all finishers. The second leg of the Rally Isle of Man awarded points at a coefficient of 1.5; thus 30 points were awarded to its winner.

Notes

References

External links

British Rally Championship seasons
Rally Championship
British Rally Championship